Kotogwanda (also spelled Koto Ngonda) is a village in eastern Ivory Coast. It is in the sub-prefecture of Koun-Fao, Koun-Fao Department, Gontougo Region, Zanzan District.

Kotogwanda was a commune until March 2012, when it became one of 1126 communes nationwide that were abolished.

Notes

Former communes of Ivory Coast
Populated places in Zanzan District
Populated places in Gontougo